Leemann is a surname. Notable people with the surname include: 

Sinja Leemann (born 2002), Swiss ice hockey player
Timothy Leemann (born 1991), Swiss figure skater

See also
Lemann